Giovanni Battista Federici (12 April 1615 – August 1657) was a Roman Catholic prelate who served as Bishop of Sagone (1655–1657).

Biography
Giovanni Battista Federici was born in La Spezia, France on 12 April 1615 and ordained a priest on 18 December 1649.
On 30 August 1655, he was appointed during the papacy of Pope Alexander VII as Bishop of Sagone.
On 14 September 1655, he was consecrated bishop by Giovanni Battista Maria Pallotta, Cardinal-Priest of San Pietro in Vincoli, with Patrizio Donati, Bishop Emeritus of Minori, and Taddeo Altini, Bishop of Civita Castellana e Orte, serving as co-consecrators.
He served as Bishop of Sagone until his death on in August 1657.

References

External links and additional sources
 (for Chronology of Bishops) 
 (for Chronology of Bishops)  

17th-century French Roman Catholic bishops
Bishops appointed by Pope Alexander VII
People from La Spezia
1615 births
1657 deaths